Fortune is the fourth album released by Beni Arashiro under her new label Universal Music Japan under the mononym Beni on November 2, 2011. The CD+DVD version is a limited edition with all her single PVs with three live videos from her recorded "Jewel tour"

Track listing

Charts

References

External links 
 Universal Fortune special-site 

2011 albums
Japanese-language albums
Beni (singer) albums